The men's lead competition in sport climbing at the 2005 World Games took place on 23 July 2005 at the Landschaftspark Duisburg-Nord in Duisburg, Germany.

Competition format
A total of 8 athletes entered the competition. Best six athletes from preliminary advances to the final.

Results

Preliminary round

Final

References